François Leon Louis Boucher (1885–1966) was a French museum curator and writer.

Boucher was born in Paris and became curator at the Musée Carnavalet, Paris. He founded the Union française des arts du costume (UFAC) that later merged with the costume museum Musée de la mode et du textile of the Louvre under the guidance of his assistant Yvonne Deslandres.
Boucher died in Neuilly-sur-Seine.

Works
 Tableau de la France par les écrivains illustres, 1948
 Histoire du Costume en Occident de l’antiquité à nos jours, 1963-5
 20,000 Years of Fashion: The History of Costume and Personal Adornment, (with Yvonne Deslandres), 1966

References

1885 births
1966 deaths
Curators from Paris
French art historians